Melicope sandwicensis, the Mt. Kaala melicope,  is a species of plant in the family Rutaceae.

It is endemic to Oahu island, of the Hawaiian Islands.

It is an Endangered species, threatened by habitat loss.

References

sandwicensis
Endemic flora of Hawaii
Biota of Oahu
Taxa named by William Jackson Hooker
Taxonomy articles created by Polbot